Ded Moroz (Dzied Maroz; , Did Moroz) or Morozko is a legendary figure similar to Saint Nicholas, Father Christmas, and Santa Claus who has his roots in Slavic mythology. The tradition of Ded Moroz is mostly spread in East Slavic countries and is an important part of Russian culture. At the beginning of the Soviet era, communist authorities banned Ded Moroz. Nevertheless, he soon became an important part of the Soviet culture. The literal translation of Ded Moroz is Grandfather Frost.

Ded Moroz wears a heel-length fur coat, in red or blue, a semi-round fur hat, and valenki on his feet. He has a long white beard. He walks with a long magic stick and often rides a troika. He is often depicted bringing presents to well-mannered children, often delivering them in person in the days of December and secretly under the New Year Tree over night on New Year's Eve.

The residence of Ded Moroz in Russia is considered to be the town of Veliky Ustyug, Vologda Oblast. The residence of the Belarusian Dzyed Maroz is said to be in Belavezhskaya Pushcha.

She is a unique attribute of Ded Moroz, since similar characters in other cultures do not have a female companion.

Development of the character

The origins of the character of Ded Moroz predates Christianity as a Slavic wizard of winter. According to some sources in Slavic mythology, Ded Moroz, back then also called Morozko or Ded, is a snow demon. However, before the Christianity of Rus' the term demon had no negative connotation. Like with many other mythical figures only over time were demons attributed negative characteristics.

Under the influence of Orthodox traditions, the character of Ded Moroz was transformed. Since the 19th century the attributes and legend of Ded Moroz have been shaped by literary influences. The play Snegurochka by Aleksandr Ostrovsky was influential in this respect, as was Rimsky-Korsakov's Snegurochka with libretto based on the play. By the end of the 19th century Ded Moroz became a popular character.

Following the Russian Revolution, Christmas traditions were actively discouraged because they were considered to be "bourgeois and religious". Similarly, in 1928 Ded Moroz was declared "an ally of the priest and kulak". Nevertheless, the image of Ded Moroz took its current form during Soviet times, becoming the main symbol of the New Year's holiday (Novy God) that replaced Christmas. Some Christmas traditions were revived following the famous letter by Pavel Postyshev, published in Pravda on December 28, 1935. Postyshev believed that the origins of the holiday, which were pre-Christian, were less important than the benefits it could bring to Soviet children.

In modern Russia

Ded Moroz is very popular in modern Russia. In 1998, the town of Veliky Ustyug in Vologda Oblast, Russia was declared the home of the Russian Ded Moroz by Yury Luzhkov, then Mayor of Moscow. Between 2003 and 2010, the post office in Veliky Ustyug received approximately 2,000,000 letters from within Russia and from all over the world for Ded Moroz.<ref name=ded>http://www.christmasdivision.ru/stati/velikij-ustjug-rodina-deda-moroza  Veliky Ustyg is the birthplace of Ded Moroz </ref> On January 7, 2008, then President Putin of the Russian Federation visited Ded Moroz' residence in the town of Veliky Ustyug as part of the Russian Orthodox Christmas Eve celebration.

The western Santa Claus made inroads in the Russian Federation during the "turbulent" 1990s when Western culture increased its penetration into the post-Soviet Russia. The resurgence of Russia in the early 21st century brought about a renewed emphasis on the basic Slavic character of Ded Moroz. This included the Russian Federation and subordinate governments sponsoring courses about Ded Moroz every December, with the aim of establishing appropriate Slavic norms for Ded Moroz and Snegurochka ("Snow Maiden" - Ded Moroz' granddaughter) roles for the New Year holiday. People playing Ded Moroz and Snegurochka now typically make appearances at children's parties during the winter holiday season, distributing presents and fighting off the wicked witch, Baba Yaga, who children are told wants to steal the gifts.

In November and December 2010, Ded Moroz was one of the candidates in the running for consideration as a mascot for the 2014 Winter Olympics in Sochi, Russia.

Variations of Ded Moroz in ethnic minority groups of Russia
Many ethnic minorities have for linguistic reasons other names for Ded Moroz or even have their own culture-equivalent counterparts to Ded Moroz. For example, in Bashkir Ded Moroz is known as Ҡыш бабай (Qïš babay, literally: "Winter Old Man"), in Tatar it has the similar spelling Qış Babay (Кыш бабай) with the same meaning. In Nenets he is known as Yamal Iri ("Grandfather of Yamal"). The Yakut indigenous people have their own counterpart to Ded Moroz, which is called Chys Khaan ("Master of Cold").

International relations of Ded Moroz
Ded Moroz, and on occasion the Belarus Dzied Maroz, are presented in the media as being in on-going détente with various counterparts from other cultures, such as the Estonian Santa Claus (Jõuluvana or "Old man of Yule"), the Finnish Santa Claus (Joulupukki or "Yule Goat"), and other Santa Claus, Father Christmas, and Saint Nicholas figures.  The détente efforts portrayed have included one-on-one meetings, group meetings and friendly competitions, such as the annual November Santa Claus championships of Celle, Germany.

GLONASS Tracks Ded Moroz
In November 2009, for the first time, the Russian Federation offered competition to NORAD Tracks Santa with GLONASS Tracks Ded Moroz, which purports to use GLONASS (GLObal NAvigation Satellite System or "the Russian GPS") to track Ded Moroz on New Year's Eve (according to the Gregorian Calendar).

The Russian-language website provides "real-time tracking" of Ded Moroz, "news" of Ded Moroz throughout the year, a form to send e-mail to Ded Moroz, photos, videos, streaming audio of Russian songs, poems and verses from children's letters to Ded Moroz, information on Veliky Ustyug in Vologda Oblast (considered to be Ded Moroz's hometown) and opportunities to enter competitions and win prizes.

Regional differences
There are equivalents of Ded Moroz and Snegurochka all over the former USSR, as well as the countries once in the Eastern bloc and in the former Yugoslavia. After the Dissolution of the Soviet Union, some of these countries made efforts to move away from Soviet and Russian heritage toward their own ancient traditions.

 Armenia 

The Armenian name for Ded Moroz is Dzmer Pap, literally Grandfather Winter. His loyal granddaughter Dzyunanushik, whose name means Snow Sweetie, or Snow Anush (a popular Armenian female name), is another counterpart of Snegurochka. The tradition was set throughout the times of the Russian Empire after the Russo-Persian War (1826-1828), when Eastern Armenia was joined to Russia according to the 1828 Treaty of Turkmenchay.

For almost 160 years of influence Dzmer Pap and Dzyunanushik have hardly changed their appearance or behavior: they come in red, blue or white winter fur coats and, bringing presents to children, expect them to sing songs or recite poems. They are parts of New Year and Christmas  matinées and shows in Armenia. In the recent decades well-off parents have developed a tradition to invite Dzmer Pap and Dzyunanushik to their children.

Azerbaijan
In Azerbaijani, Ded Moroz is known as Şaxta Baba ("Grandfather Frost") and his companion Snegurochka is known as Qar Qızı ("Snow Girl"). In the predominantly Muslim but secular country, where Christians are a small minority, this tradition remains very popular. Şaxta Baba brings gifts to children at New Year celebrations, however Qar Qızı is rarely present at the festivities.

Belarus
Ded Moroz is Dzied Maroz in the Belarusian language. He is not a historical folkloric Belarusian character, but was a replacement for Saint Nicholas, known locally as Śviaty Mikałaj, whom Soviet authorities disapproved of because of his Christian origin.

The official residence of Dzied Maroz in Belarus is declared to be in Białowieża Forest.

Bulgaria
The Bulgarian name of Santa Claus is Дядо Коледа (Dyado Koleda, Grandfather Koleda), with Dyado Mraz (Дядо Мраз, "Grandfather Frost") being a similar Russian-imported character lacking the Christian connotations and thus popular during Communist rule. However, he has been largely forgotten since 1989, when Dyado Koleda again returned as the more popular figure.

Former Yugoslavia
In socialist Yugoslavia (i.e. Bosnia and Herzegovina, Croatia, Montenegro, Macedonia, Serbia, and Slovenia) the character who was said to bring gifts to children was called "Grandfather Frost". He was said to bring gifts for the New Year because public celebration of Christmas was frowned upon during communism.Klobčar, Marija. 2009. Christmas Songs and Constructing Identities. Traditiones 38(1): 173–188, p. 173.

In Croatia after the breakup of Yugoslavia, Djed Mraz was labeled a communist creation and Djed Božićnjak (literally: "Grandfather Christmas") was introduced. Attempts were made in the mass media and advertising to replace Djed Mraz with Djed Božićnjak. After 1999 the names of Djed Mraz and Djed Božićnjak became more or less synonymous, including in their use on public television. In some families Djed Mraz is still said to brings gifts at New Year. In Croatia, children also get presents on December 6. Due to the historical influence of Austrian culture in parts of Croatia, presents are also said to be brought by a traditional figure called Sveti Nikola (Saint Nicholas) who closely resembles Djed Mraz or Djed Božićnjak, except for the fact that he is accompanied by Krampus who takes misbehaving children away, another character from Central European folklore. In some religious families, little Jesus (Isusek, Mali Isus, Kriskindl) is said to brings gifts at Christmas instead of Djed Božićnjak. Also, in some parts of Dalmatia the gifts are brought by Saint Lucy (Sveta Lucija).

Kazakhstan and Kyrgyzstan
Ayaz Ata is the Kazakh and Kyrgyz name for Ded Moroz.

 Mongolia 
Since the introduction and familiarization of Russian culture during the socialist era, Mongolia has been celebrating the New Year's festivities as a formal holiday. "Өвлийн өвгөн" (Övliin Övgön, Grandfather Winter) is the Mongolian equivalent of Ded Moroz, who brings children and adult alike gifts on New Year's Eve.

Romania

In 1948, after the Communists gained power in Romania, it was decided that Christmas should not be celebrated. December 25 and December 26 became working days and no official celebrations were to be held. As a replacement for Moş Crăciun (Father Christmas), a new character was introduced, Moş Gerilă (literally "Old Man Frosty", a Romanian language adaptation of the Russian Ded Moroz). He was said to bring gifts to children on December 31.

Officially, the New Year's Day celebrations began on 30 December, which was named the Day of the Republic, since it was the day when King Mihai I of Romania abdicated in 1947.

After the Romanian Revolution of 1989, Moş Gerilă lost his influence, being replaced by Moş Crăciun.

Sakha Republic
Chys Khan is known as the master of cold, accompanied by the snow maiden Khaarchana.

Slovenia

In Slovenia, the name Ded Moroz was translated from Russian as Dedek Mraz (literally, "Grandpa Frost"). Dedek Mraz is depicted as a slim man wearing a grey leather coat, which has fur inside and is decorated outside, and a round dormouse fur cap. This version of the character is based on traditional imagery, especially as depicted by Maksim Gaspari in images commissioned in 1952. Although the name was translated literally from the Soviet figure, other names for the character were also considered: Sneženi mož ("the Snow Man") and oca Triglav ("Daddy Triglav"). A female figure named babica Zima (Grandma Winter) was also proposed. Initially he was said to live in Siberia, but with the Informbiro crisis and the schism between Yugoslavia and the Soviet Union his home was relocated to Mt. Triglav, Slovenia's (and also Yugoslavia's) highest peak. Public processions featuring the character began in Ljubljana in 1953. The notion of Grandpa Frost was ideologically useful because it served to reorient the December/January holidays away from religion (Saint Nicholas Day and Christmas) and towards the secular New Year. After the ousting of Communism at the beginning of the 1990s, two other "good old men" (as they are currently styled in Slovenian) reappeared in public: Miklavž ("Saint Nicholas") is said to bring presents on December 6, and Božiček ("Christmas man"; usually depicted as Santa Claus) on Christmas Eve. St. Nicholas has had a strong traditional presence in Slovenian ethnic territory and his feast day remained celebrated in family circles throughout the Communist period. Until the late 1940s it was also said in some areas of Slovenia that Christkind (called Jezušček ("little Jesus") or Božiček) brought gifts on Christmas Eve. Slovenian families have different preferences regarding their gift-giver of choice, according to political or religious persuasion. Slovenian popular culture depicts Grandpa Frost, Saint Nicholas and Santa Claus as friends and has also started blending attributes of the characters, for example, mention of Santa's reindeer is sometimes mingled into the Grandpa Frost narrative at public appearances. Due to his non-religious character and strong institutionalization, Grandpa Frost continues to retain a public presence.

Tajikistan
In Tajikistan the tradition of Ded Moroz has continued. In Tajik, Ded Moroz is known as Boboi Barfi ("Grandfather Snow"), and Snegurochka is called Barfak ("Snowball").

In 2012, a young man dressed as Ded Moroz was stabbed to death in Dushanbe by a crowd shouting "You infidel!". The murder was motivated by religious hatred, according to the Tajik police.

On 11 December 2013, Saidali Siddiqov, the first deputy head of the Committee for TV and Radio-broadcasting under the Government of Tajikistan, announced in an interview that "Father Frost, his maiden sidekick Snegurochka (Maiden Snow), and New Year’s tree will not appear on the state television this year, because these personages and attributes bear no direct relation to our national traditions, though there is no harm in them". However next day this was denounced, and planned celebrations did include these despite objections of some religious figures.

Ukraine

Since the breakup of the USSR, and especially in recent years, there has been a shift from Did Moroz, who came to be associated with the Soviet-era heritage, to the more traditional Saint Nicholas (Святий Миколай, Sviatyi Mykolai''), who is more popular in Western Ukraine. There were rumors that Did Moroz imagery was discouraged by the authorities due to conflict with Russia; however, the Ukrainian Ministry of Culture has refuted this.

Uzbekistan
In 2012, Uzbekistan, a largely Muslim nation, moved away from celebrating Christmas and its historical characters

See also

References

External links

 "Just Don't Call Me Santa!"—A history of Ded Maroz in English 
 "Father Frost, the Red Nose" on Russia Info-Centre
 Reveling in Russian Santa’s fairytale home
 Home page all of the Ded's Moroz 
 GLONASS Tracks Ded Moroz 
 Coat of arms of Ded Moroz 

Christmas characters
Holiday characters
New Year celebrations
Slavic mythology
Winter traditions
Russian folklore characters
Belarusian traditions
Russian traditions
Slavic legendary creatures
Personifications of weather
Slavic folklore characters
Christmas gift-bringers